{{Infobox legislature|political_groups1=Government (70)NDA (70)
 BJP (68)
 AD(S) (1)
 NP (1)
Opposition (16)
 SP (16)
Others (11)
 BSP (3)
 INC (1)
 JSD(L) (1)
 IND (6)
Vacant (3)
 Vacant (3)|party8=TBD|party9=BJP|party10=SP|election1=29 July 2019|election2=19 March 2017|election3=31 January 2021|election5=19 March 2017|election7=29 March 2022|election9=19 March 2017|election10=26 March 2022|structure1=Uttar Pradesh Legislative Council.svg|structure2=Uttar Pradesh Legislative Assembly after 2022 elections.svg|political_groups2=Government (273)NDA (273)
 BJP (255)
 AD(S) (12)
 NISHAD (6)
Opposition (119)SP+ (119)
 SP (111)
 RLD (8)
Others (5) 
 SBSP (6)
 INC (2)
 JSD(L) (2)
 BSP (1)|party6=TBD|structure1_res=400px|structure2_res=400px|house1=Uttar Pradesh Legislative Council|house2=Uttar Pradesh Legislative Assembly|voting_system1=Single transferable vote|voting_system2=First-past-the-post|last_election1=9 April 2022|last_election2=10 February - 7 March 2022|next_election1=2028|next_election2=2027|session_room=Vidhan Sabha Lucknow.jpg|meeting_place=Vidhan Bhawan|session_res=200px|website=|party7=BJP|party5=BJP|name=Uttar Pradesh Legislature|leader9=Yogi Adityanath |native_name=उत्तर प्रदेश विधानमंडल|coa_res=225px|coa_alt=Seal of Uttar Pradesh|coa_caption=Seal of the Uttar Pradesh|house_type=Bicameral|houses=Uttar Pradesh Legislative Council (Upper House)Uttar Pradesh Legislative Assembly (Lower House)|leader1=Anandiben Patel|leader2=Yogi Adityanath|leader3=Kunwar Manvendra Singh|leader4=Vacant|leader5=Keshav Prasad Maurya |leader6=Vacant|leader7=Satish Mahana|leader8=Vacant|leader10=Akhilesh Yadav|party4=TBD|coa_pic=Seal of Uttar Pradesh.svg|foundation=|leader1_type=Governor|leader2_type=Chief Minister|leader3_type=Chairman|leader4_type=Deputy Chairman|leader5_type=Leader of HouseLegislative Council|leader6_type=Leader of OppositionLegislative Council|leader7_type=Speaker|leader8_type=Deputy Speaker|leader9_type=Leader of HouseLegislative Assembly|leader10_type=Leader of OppositionLegislative Assembly|party2=BJP|party3=BJP|constitution=Constitution of India|election6=28 March 2022|seats=503}}The Uttar Pradesh Legislature is the bicameral legislature of the Indian state of Uttar Pradesh. It composed of the governor and both the houses of state legislature. The governor in his/her role as head of the legislature and has full powers to summon and prorogue either house of legislature or to dissolve the Vidhan Sabha. The governor can exercise these powers only upon the advice of the chief minister and his Council of Ministers. The legislature meets 3 times a year at Vidhan Bhavan in Lucknow.

 Composition 
The Uttar Pradesh Legislature consists of two houses, namely the Vidhan Sabha and the Vidhan Parishad, with the governor acting as their head.

 Governor 
The Governor of the Uttar Pradesh acts as the head of the legislature and enjoys all executive, legislative and discretionary powers of the state. The governors of the states of India have similar powers and functions at the state level as those of the president of India at the central level. The Governor is appointed by the President of India for the term of 5 years.

 Sessions of the Legislature 
The period during which the both the house meets to conduct its business is called a session. The constitution empowers the governor to summon each house at such intervals that there should not be more than a six-month gap between the two sessions. Hence the Legislature must meet at least twice a year. In India, the legislature of each state conducts three sessions each year:

 Budget session: January/February to May
 Monsoon session: July to August/September
 Winter session'': November to December

Meeting Place 

The Vidhan Bhavan located at VS Marg in Lucknow, the capital of the state serves as the seat and the meeting place for both the houses of the legislature. All three sessions of the legislature held here only. The building was designed by Samuel Swinton Jacob and Heera Singh; Singh also drew up the blueprint of the building. Butler subsequently monitored the construction of the building. The building was completed in little over five years at a cost of ₹21 lakh (equivalent to ₹36 crore or US$4.6 million in 2020) (1922 cost not adjusted for inflation) and was inaugurated on 21 February 1928.

See also 

 Uttar Pradesh Legislative Assembly
 Uttar Pradesh Legislative Council
 Yogi Adityanath
 Lucknow
 Uttar Pradesh

 
Bicameral legislatures
State legislatures of India